Flight 307 may refer to:

Northwest Orient Airlines Flight 307, crashed on On 7 March 1950
TAI Flight 307, crashed on 24 September 1959
Balkan Bulgarian Airlines Flight 307, crashed on 3 March 1973

0307